2014 is the 55th season of the Professional Bowlers Association (PBA) Tour and the sixth straight season in which all of the North American fall events are condensed into the PBA World Series of Bowling (WSOB). The 2014 season consisted of 20 individual title events plus a "PBA League" team title event. The 2014 season is the first season since 2000 to follow a calendar year schedule.

Tournament schedule and recaps
For the sixth year in a row, the PBA held the fall North American events in one location at the PBA World Series of Bowling VI (WSOB VI). Preliminary rounds and match play took place October 24 through October 31, with taping of the final televised rounds on November 2. The four standard "animal pattern" tournaments in WSOB VI served as the initial qualifying rounds for the PBA World Championship. After 28 qualifying games (7 per pattern tournament), the top 24 bowlers (in total pinfall) bowled an additional 24 games of match play (three rounds of eight games) to determine the top five players for the TV finals.  The World Championship returned to a split format, as in 2009-10. After the match play rounds at WSOB VI, the stepladder finals were held live on January 11, 2015.

Following the WSOB, the Round1 Japan Cup invitational tournament took place in Japan, with a final televised round on November 15. Several international tour stops, which are part of the World Bowling Tour (WBT), were again part of the PBA Tour schedule. As in 2012–13, a PBA title is awarded if any of these stops are won by a PBA member.

Notably absent from the PBA schedule in 2014 is the U.S. Open. The event was not hosted in 2014, as the BPAA (the tournament's primary sponsor) was unable to find additional sponsorship.

Season highlights
 Jason Belmonte won the first two majors of the season, at the Barbasol Tournament of Champions and the USBC Masters, giving him three majors among his ten total titles. This was Jason's second consecutive victory in the USBC Masters, making him the first person to successfully defend a Masters title since Billy Welu in 1965.
 The "PBA League" team tournament was held for the second straight season. The 2014 team title went to the Silver Lake Atom Splitters, coached by former pro Mark Baker and featuring Chris Barnes, Bryon Smith, Tommy Jones, Wes Malott, and Dom Barrett as team members.
 Sean Rash rolled the PBA's 23rd televised perfect 300 game in the opening match of the PBA Wolf Open finals, which aired June 3. Sean went on to win the tournament for his eighth PBA title.
 Ronnie Russell rolled the PBA's 24th televised 300 game in the challenge round of the WSOB Chameleon Championship on November 2, 2014 (broadcast December 28, 2014). Russell would lose the title match, however, to D. J. Archer.

Tournament summary
Below is a schedule of events for the 2014 PBA Tour season. Major tournaments are in bold. Career PBA title numbers for winners are shown in parenthesis (x).

C: broadcast on CBS Sports Network
E: broadcast on ESPN
 +Sean Rash won an additional $10,000 for scoring 300 in the opening match of the TV finals of the PBA Wolf Open.
 ++Ronnie Russell won an additional $10,000 for scoring 300 in the opening match of the TV finals of the WSOB VI Chameleon Open.

References

External links
2014 Season Schedule
2014 WBT Schedule

Professional Bowlers Association seasons
2014 in bowling